Arnold Matsulevych (born 14 February 1932) is a Soviet sprinter. He competed in the men's 4 × 400 metres relay at the 1960 Summer Olympics.

References

1932 births
Living people
Athletes (track and field) at the 1960 Summer Olympics
Soviet male sprinters
Soviet male hurdlers
Olympic athletes of the Soviet Union
Place of birth missing (living people)